Lappa, or Lampa (Λάμπα), or Lampae or Lampai (Λάμπαι), or Lampe (Λάμπη), was an inland town of ancient Crete, with a district extending from sea to sea, and possessing the port Phoenix. Although the several forms of this city's name occur in ancient authors, yet on coins and in inscriptions the word Lappa is alone found. Stephanus of Byzantium shows plainly that the two names denote the same place, when he says that Xenion, in his Cretica, wrote the word Lappa, and not Lampa. The same author says that it was founded by Agamemnon, and was called after one Lampos, a Tarrhaean; the interpretation of which seems to be that it was a colony of Tarrha.

When Lyctus had been destroyed by the Cnossians, its citizens found refuge with the people of Lappa. After the submission of Cydonia, Cnossus, Lyctus, and Eleutherna, to the arms of Metellus, the Romans advanced against Lappa, which was taken by storm, and appears to have been almost entirely destroyed. Augustus, in consideration of the aid rendered to him by the Lappaeans in his struggle with Marcus Antonius bestowed on them their freedom, and also restored their city. When Christianity was established, Lappa became an episcopal see; the name of its bishop is recorded as present at the Council of Ephesus of 431, and the Council of Chalcedon of 451, as well as on many other subsequent occasions.

One of the inscriptions relating to this city mentions a certain Marcus Aurelius Clesippus, in whose honour the Lappaeans erected a statue.

The head of its benefactor Augustus is exhibited on the coins of Lappa: one has the epigraph, ΘΕΩΚΑΙΣΑΝΙ ΣΕΒΑΣΤΩ; others of Domitian and Commodus are found. On the autonomous coins of Lappa feature maritime symbols, which are accounted for by the extension of its territory to both shores, and the possession of the port of Phoenix.

The site of Lappa is located near modern Argyroupoli.

References

Populated places in ancient Crete
Former populated places in Greece
Ancient Greek archaeological sites in Greece
Archaeological sites in Crete